Monnickendamplein is a RandstadRail station in The Hague, Netherlands. It is a stop for RandstadRail line 4, tram line 6, and bus line 26, and is located on the Escamplaan. Passengers should change here between lines 4 and 6.

RandstadRail services
The following services currently call at Monnickendamplein:

Tram Services

Gallery

RandstadRail stations in The Hague